Altenberg Abbey is a former Premonstratensian nunnery situated between Solms and Wetzlar, Hesse, Germany. It had a strong connection with the House of Nassau, several of whom were nuns and abbesses, and some family members, including Otto I, Count of Nassau, were buried here; it was also a burial place for the Counts of Solms. The buildings were seriously damaged by a fire in 1952. Those that survive accommodate a meeting centre for the local deanery and since 2018 a small Protestant religious community.

References

External links
LAGIS-Hessen.de
Landesamt für Denkmalpflege Hessen

Further reading

 Albert Hardt: Urkundenbuch der Klöster Altenberg, Dorlar, Retters. Wolfenacker 2000
 
 
Begründer der Oranier-Linie liegt auf dem Altenberg begraben, Wetzlarer Neue Zeitung, 11 April 2016
 Thomas Doepner: Das Prämonstratenserinnenkloster Altenberg im Hoch- und Spätmittelalter. Sozial- und frömmigkeitsgeschichtliche Untersuchungen. (Untersuchungen und Materialien zur Verfassungs- und Landesgeschichte; 16), Zugl.: Köln, Univ. Diss., ed. Hessisches Landesamt für geschichtliche Landeskunde, N.G. Elwert Verlag, Marburg 1999, 

Premonstratensian monasteries in Germany
Nunneries in Germany